Teven Bradlee Jenkins (born March 3, 1998) is an American football guard for the Chicago Bears of the National Football League (NFL). He played college football at Oklahoma State and was drafted by the Bears in the second round of the 2021 NFL Draft.

Early life and high school
Jenkins was born and grew up in Topeka, Kansas, and attended Topeka High School, where he played baseball, basketball and football. He was named All-State in his junior and senior seasons. Jenkins was rated a three-star recruit and committed to play college football at Oklahoma State over offers from Kansas State, Louisville, Missouri and Nebraska.

College career
Jenkins redshirted his true freshman season. He played in twelve games with three starts the following season. Jenkins was named the Cowboys starting right tackle going into his redshirt sophomore season and was named honorable mention All-Big 12 Conference after starting all 13 of the team's games, with three starts coming at left tackle due to an injury to regular starter Arlington Hambright. He was again named honorable mention All-Big 12 after his redshirt junior season. He started every game as a senior and was named to the 2020 All-Big 12 Conference football team.

Professional career

Jenkins was selected by the Chicago Bears in the second round (39th overall) of the 2021 NFL Draft. He signed his four-year rookie contract with Chicago on June 16, 2021. He was placed on injured reserve on September 1, 2021 after undergoing back surgery. He was activated on December 4, and debuted on special teams for the Bears against the Arizona Cardinals on December 5. Jenkins saw his first play time on offense during Week 14 after left tackle Jason Peters suffered an injury. Jenkins made his first start in the NFL the next week against the Minnesota Vikings.

During the 2022 preseason, the Bears chose to switch Jenkins from offensive tackle to right guard. He started 11 games at right guard before being placed on injured reserve on January 4, 2023.

References

External links 

Oklahoma State Cowboys bio

1998 births
Living people
American football offensive tackles
Players of American football from Kansas
Oklahoma State Cowboys football players
Sportspeople from Topeka, Kansas
Chicago Bears players